Orbán Government may refer to:

 First Orbán government, 1998–2002
 Second Orbán Government, 2010–2014
 Third Orbán Government, 2014–2018
 Fourth Orbán Government, 2018–2022
 Fifth Orbán Government, from 2022